Thiago Pimentel Gosling or simply Thiago Gosling (born April 25, 1979 in Belo Horizonte), is a Brazilian central defender. He has retired from professional football and currently plays Showbol exhibitions.

Career 
On 9 March 2009 Vitória have signed central defender from Cruzeiro until December of this year. Thiago has retired from football and plays Showbol exhibitions around Brazil for Atletico Mineiro Club.

Honours
 Brazilian League: 2003
Brazilian Cup: 2003
Minas Gerais State League: 2003
Guanabara Cup: 2007
Rio de Janeiro State League: 2007
Minas Gerais State League: 2008

External links
 Guardian Stats Centre

1979 births
Living people
Brazilian footballers
Brazilian expatriate footballers
Serie B players
Cruzeiro Esporte Clube players
Genoa C.F.C. players
Fluminense FC players
CR Flamengo footballers
Expatriate footballers in Italy
Brazilian people of German descent
América Futebol Clube (MG) players
Association football defenders
Footballers from Belo Horizonte

Brazilian people of English descent